Mount Archer is a suburb of Rockhampton and a mountain in the Rockhampton Region, Queensland, Australia.

Geography 
The Mount Archer National Park surrounds the mountain. Mount Archer is located within the boundaries of the city of Rockhampton. The summit is accessible by a sealed road, Pilbeam Drive, which leads to the upmarket small suburb of Mount Archer, located just below the summit. Lookouts and picnic areas are located on the summit of the mountain, as well as a number of communications towers.

History 
The mountain was named in 1859 by surveyor Clarendon Stuart after the Archer brothers who established a pastoral property at Gracemere in 1854.

Frenchville State School opened on 25 January 1981. Located at the base of the mountain, Mount Archer State School is within in the present-day suburb of Koongal.

See also

 List of mountains in Australia

References

Archer
Suburbs of Rockhampton